Melaleuca linariifolia is a plant in the myrtle family Myrtaceae, and is endemic to eastern Australia. It is commonly known as snow-in-summer, narrow-leaved paperbark, flax-leaved paperbark and in the language of the Gadigal people as budjur. A hardy plant, it flowers prolifically in late spring or summer, making it a popular garden shrub or small tree in temperate places. Melaleuca trichostachya is a similar species but its leaves are arranged differently and the fruits have projecting valves.

Description

The flowers are white to creamy-white, perfumed and arranged in spikes on the ends of branches which continue to grow after flowering, sometimes also in the upper leaf axils. The stamens are arranged in five bundles around the flower and each bundle contains 32 to 73 stamens. 

The fruiting capsules have valves which do not project beyond the rim of the capsule.

Taxonomy and naming
Melaleuca linariifolia was first formally described in 1797 by James Edward Smith in Transactions of the Linnean Society of London. Smith noted that "This, we are told by Mr White, is a large tree, the bark of which is very thick and spongy, serving the purpose of tinder." The specific epithet linariifolia means "with leaves like Linaria" (a genus of plants in the family Plantaginaceae).

Distribution
Snow-in-summer occurs from the Maryborough district in Queensland to Bawley Point in the Ulladulla district in New South Wales. There is also a disjunct population in the Blackdown Tableland National Park in Queensland. It is found in heath and dry sclerophyll forest habitats, usually growing near watercourses or swamps.

Uses

Horticulture
Melaleuca linariifolia is cultivated as an ornamental tree for parks and gardens and is also used as a screen or windbreak in Australia and overseas. It is popular as a nature strip tree in Melbourne in Victoria. It tolerates both dry and boggy conditions and is frost hardy. It should be planted with caution as it can damage wastewater pipes, and is easily ignitable, so should not be planted in fire-prone areas. It has also become a garden escape in Western Australia, however it suitable for planting under powerlines and is a food or habitat sources for native animals, including many insects.

Essential oils
This species is rich in essential oils, especially Terpinen-4-ol. It has a wider range of tolerance to environmental conditions than the main current source of "tea tree" oil, Melaleuca alternifolia and therefore has potential as an alternative.

Gallery

See also

Melaleuca decora, similar looking tree in the same genus

References

linariifolia
Trees of Australia
Myrtales of Australia
Flora of New South Wales
Flora of Queensland
Garden plants of Australia
Drought-tolerant trees
Plants described in 1797
Taxa named by Lyndley Craven